Nitrazepate (Lorzem) is a drug which is a benzodiazepine derivative and has anxiolytic properties. It is normally produced as its potassium salt, potassium nitrazepate.

See also
Benzodiazepine

References

GABAA receptor positive allosteric modulators
Lactams
Nitrobenzodiazepines